The Tennessee Central Railway Museum (TCRM, reporting mark TCRX) is a railroad museum located in Nashville, Tennessee.

It is a small non-profit facility which is preserving the heritage of rail transport in Tennessee and the central South.  The museum's name honors the former Tennessee Central Railway.

The museum maintains a collection of historic rolling stock which it restores and uses for rail excursions in the area, both for fundraising and educational purposes.

It runs an all-volunteer heritage railroad dedicated to preserving, restoring, interpreting, and operating historic railroad equipment.  TCRM currently has nine diesel-electric locomotives and thirty other cars/engines.

Inside the freight depot where the museum is located, there are railroad artifacts and memorabilia, a gift shop, and a large room where model train layouts in HO and N scale are displayed.

See also
List of heritage railroads in the United States
List of transport museums

References

External links
 Museum website

Museums in Nashville, Tennessee
Railroad museums in Tennessee
Heritage railroads in Tennessee